Nazare Dam, also called Malharsagar, is an earthfill dam on Karha river near Jejuri, Pune district in the state of Maharashtra in India.

Specifications

See also
 Dams in Maharashtra
 List of reservoirs and dams in India

References

Dams in Pune district
Dams completed in 1974
1974 establishments in Maharashtra
20th-century architecture in India